Dolicholana is a genus of isopod crustaceans. which was first described by Niel L. Bruce in 1986. The type species is Cirolana elongata Milne Edwards, 1840.

Australian states where Dolicholana species are found are Queensland and New South Wales. Beyond Australian waters species of this genus are found in the waters of Myanmar, and the  Straits of Malacca.

Species

Dolicholana includes the following species:

Dolicholana brucei 
Dolicholana elongata 
Dolicholana enigma 
Dolicholana porcellana

References

Cymothoida
Isopod genera
Taxa named by Niel L. Bruce
Crustaceans described in 1986